East Boston High School is a public high school located in the neighborhood of East Boston in Boston, Massachusetts. Specifically, the school is situated in the Eagle Hill Historic District. East Boston High is part of the Boston Public Schools system.

Academics
The Boston Public Schools assigns students to East Boston High School based on applicant preference and students priorities in various zones. Due to isolated geographic location, all East Boston residents are guaranteed seats at the school.

East Boston High offers various Advanced Placement courses, honors courses, and two languages, Spanish and Italian. The school also accepts students with disabilities under its Special Education department. According to the 2011–2012 school report conducted by the Massachusetts Department of Elementary and Secondary Education, East Boston High is made up of 18.1% special education students.  Bilingual education classes are also offered.

East Boston High has an Army Junior Reserve Officers' Training Corps, known simply as JROTC, that students may take voluntarily.  The program includes competitive rifle and drill teams.

East Boston High has a professional partnership school with Harvard University Graduate School of Education's Teacher Education Program.

In 1996 and 2001, the architect Doris Cole led the design of renovations to the school.

Student body
As of 2011–2012, the school is 1,382 students. Within the enrollment, 65.5% were identified as Hispanic, 16.1% as African American, 15.5% as White, 1.9% as Asian, and the rest as Pacific Islander, Native American, and multiracial. 18.1% of the students were enrolled in the special education program.

Athletics
East Boston High School offers a range of sports. They include boys' football, basketball, baseball, and soccer along with girls' basketball, soccer, softball, and volleyball. The school's hockey, indoor track, outdoor track, and swimming teams are co-educational. Teams compete within the Boston City League of the Massachusetts Interscholastic Athletic Association (MIAA).

Notable faculty
Annissa Essaibi George (social studies)

Notable alumni
Will Blalock (did not graduate), professional basketball player
Letterio Calapai (1923), artist
Enrico Cappucci, politician
James Crowley (1905), college basketball coach
Adio diBiccari (1932), sculptor
Frank A. Goodwin (1892), politician
Salvatore LaMattina (1978), politician
Michele McPhee (1988), journalist
Johnny Rae (1952), musician
Frank Renzulli (1975), actor
Mario Umana (1932), politician
John Varone (1954), professional football player
Jermaine Wiggins (1993), professional football player

References

External links

 Official website
 Profile at Boston Public Schools

1926 establishments in Massachusetts
East Boston
Educational institutions established in 1926
High schools in Boston
Public high schools in Massachusetts